English subordinators (also known as subordinating conjunctions or complementizers) are words that mostly mark clauses as subordinate. The subordinators form a closed lexical category in English and include for, how, if, that, to, and whether.

Syntactically, they appear immediately before the subordinate element. Semantically, they tend to be empty.

Terminology and membership 
Matthews defines subordinator as "a word, etc. which marks a clause as subordinate." Most dictionaries and many traditional grammar books use the term subordinating conjunction and include a much larger set of words, mostly composed of prepositions, such as before, when, and though that take clausal complements. The generative grammar tradition uses the term complementizer, a term which sometimes excludes the prepositions.

Membership 
The subordinators include for, how, if, that, whether, and to.

For 
For is a subordinator only when it marks infinitival clauses such as For that to happen. In other cases, it's a preposition.

How 
For is a marginal subordinator only when it marks infinitival clauses such as She told him how it wasn't fun anymore. Note that that could substitute for how in this example. In other cases, it's an adverb or occasionally and adjective.

If 
If is a subordinator when in marks closed interrogative content clauses such as I wonder if this would work. It's always possible to substitute whether for if. In all other cases, if is a preposition with a conditional meaning.

That 
That is a subordinator when in marks declarative content clauses such as I think that this would work and in relative clauses such as the fact that he was there. In all other cases, it's a determiner.

Whether 
Whether is always a subordinator. It marks closed interrogative content clauses such as I wonder whether this would work. It's often possible to substitute if for whether, the main exceptions being when the subordinate clause functions as a subject, as in Whether it's true is an empirical question and cases with or not, such as I'll be there whether you are there or not.

To 
To is a subordinator when it marks infinitival verb phrases such as To be sure, we'd have to double check. It is the only subordinator that marks a verb phrase, not a clause, as subordinate.

Various linguists, including Geoff Pullum, Paul Postal and Richard Hudson, and Robert Fiengohas have suggested that to in cases like I want to go (not the preposition to) is a special case of an auxiliary verb with no tensed forms. Rodney Huddleston argues against this position in The Cambridge Grammar of the English Language, but Robert Levine counters these proposals. BetteLou Los calls Pullum's arguments that to is an auxiliary verb"compelling".

Subordinators vs other categories

Subordinators vs prepositions 
Traditional grammar includes in the class of "subordinating conjunctions" prepositions like because, while, and unless, which take clausal complement. But since at least Jespersen (see English prepositions for the historical development of the idea) most modern grammarians distinguish these two categories based on whether they add meaning to the sentence or are purely functional. The distinction can be shown with if, since there is a subordinator if and a preposition if. The preposition introduces a conditional meaning (e.g., if it works, that's great). Subordinators, though, have no meaning. They just mark a clause as subordinate; there is no difference in meaning between I know that you were there and I know you were there. Similarly, in She asked if we were there the complementizer if merely marks the following clause as a closed interrogative content clause, without adding any conditional meaning.

References 
Subordinators

Subordinators by language